Looze may refer to:

 Looze, Yonne, France

People
 Bram De Looze (born 1991), Belgian jazz pianist
 Dennis Looze (born 1972), Dutch athlete
 Pieter de Looze (1811–1881), Dutch publisher
 Ray Looze, American swimming coach
 Tracy Looze (born 1973), Dutch athlete

See also
 Lose (disambiguation)
 Loose (disambiguation)